The Daily Star is a daily newspaper in Oneonta, New York, United States. It is owned by Community Newspaper Holdings Inc.

It also owns and operates the Cooperstown Crier, a weekly newspaper in Cooperstown, New York.

Community Newspaper Holdings bought The Daily Star and Cooperstown Crier in late 2006 from Ottaway Community Newspapers, a division of Dow Jones & Company.

References

External links 
 The Daily Star website
 Cooperstown Crier website
 CNHI website

Daily newspapers published in New York (state)
Otsego County, New York